Clube Desportivo Académica de Luanda is an Angolan sports club from Luanda. The club's roller hockey team competes at the local level, at the Luanda Provincial Roller Hockey Championship and at the Angolan Roller Hockey Championship. Additionally, the team has been a regular contestant at the African Roller Hockey Club Championships.

Académica de Luanda is the current African club champion, after winning the third edition of the African Roller Hockey Club Championship, in 2010 in Pretoria, South Africa.

Honours
Angola Hockey League :
Winner (5): 2009, 2010, 2012, 2013, 2014
 Runner Up (0) :
Angola Cup:
Winner (3): 2014, 2015, 2016
 Runner Up (0) :
Angola Super Cup:
Winner (5): 2010, 2013, 2015, 2016, 2017
 Runner Up (1) : 2014
The President's Cup:
Winner (1): 2014
 Runner Up (0) :
African Champions League:
Winner (1): 2010
 Runner Up (0) :

Squad

Players

Former notable players

Managers
  Orlando Graça

References

Sports clubs in Angola
Roller hockey clubs in Angola